George Edward Milles-Lade, 2nd Earl Sondes (11 May 1861 – 1 October 1907), styled Viscount Throwley from 1880 to 1894, was an English aristocrat and amateur cricketer. He was the eldest son of George Milles, 1st Earl Sondes, and succeeded as the 2nd Earl in September 1894. He was born at Lees Court at Sheldwich south of Faversham in Kent in 1861.

Cricket
Educated at Eton College and Magdalene College, Cambridge, Milles-Lade was in the Eton cricket team in 1879 and 1880. In 1882 he made his first-class cricket debut for Kent County Cricket Club against Yorkshire at Sheffield, the first of six matches he played for the county side, making four appearances in 1882 and two in 1884. He played regularly in club cricket for teams such as I Zingari and Band of Brothers, a club closely associated with Kent. He was elected President of the county club in 1891 and in the same year toured North America with Lord Hawke's side, playing in the two first-class matches during the tour against the Gentlemen of Philadelphia.

Milles-Lade's brother, Henry Milles, also played occasionally for Kent as well as on Lord Hawke's American tour. His father had also been a keen cricketer, playing in a single first-class game for the Gentlemen of Kent in 1849. The family were closely associated with Kent cricket throughout the 19th century.

Military service and death
Milles-Lade served in the Second Boer War with the Royal East Kent Yeomanry where he was shot and wounded. His health suffered due to pleurisy contracted as a result of the wound and he required repeated operations. He died aged 46 from heart failure following an operation in October 1907. He was unmarried and he was succeeded as Lord Sondes by his brother Lewis Arthur Milles, 3rd Earl Sondes.

References

External links

1861 births
1907 deaths
English cricketers
Kent cricketers
Royal East Kent Yeomanry officers
People educated at Eton College
British Army personnel of the Second Boer War
Lord Hawke's XI cricketers
George 2
Milles-Lade family